Verkhneozyorsky is a rural locality (a settlement) in Kamenno-Stepnoye Rural Settlement, Talovsky District, Voronezh Oblast, Russia. The population was 440 as of 2010. There are 6 streets.

Geography 
Verkhneozyorsky is located 9 km south of Talovaya (the district's administrative centre) by road. Vysoky is the nearest rural locality.

References 

Rural localities in Talovsky District